Cor Luiten (3 April 1929 – 9 November 1978) was a Dutch footballer. He played in four matches for the Netherlands national football team from 1953 to 1954.

References

External links
 

1929 births
1978 deaths
Dutch footballers
Netherlands international footballers
Place of birth missing
Association footballers not categorized by position